The Food and Drug Administration (FDA) of the Philippines, formerly the Bureau of Food and Drugs (BFAD ; 1982–2009), is a health regulatory agency under the Department of Health created on 1963 by Republic Act No. 3720, amended on 1987 by Executive Order 175 otherwise known as the “Food, Drugs and Devices, and Cosmetics Act”, and subsequently reorganized by Republic Act No. 9711 otherwise known as “The Food and Drug Administration Act of 2009”. The agency is responsible for licensing, monitoring, and regulation of cosmetics, drugs, foods, household hazardous products, medical devices and electromagnetic radiation emitting devices, pesticides, tobacco and related products, and vaccines for safety, efficacy, and quality in the Republic of the Philippines.

The Philippine FDA is led by the Director General appointed by the President of the Philippines and two deputies for Internal Management and Field Regulatory Operations. Usec. Dr. Samuel Zacate, MD is the Director General since August 3, 2022.

The FDA has its central office in Alabang, Muntinlupa. The agency has 4 centers located at its central office, and 5 clusters of field regulatory operations and 4 laboratories located throughout the archipelago. The agency also grants accreditation to private sector laboratories for testing of COVID-19.

Organizational chart 

 Department of Health
 Food and Drug Administration
 Office of the Director General
 Center for Cosmetic and Household/Urban Hazardous Substances Regulation and Research (CCHUHSRR)
 Center for Device Regulation, Radiation Health, and Research (CDRRHR)
 Center for Drug Regulation and Research (CDRR)
 Center for Food Regulation and Research (CFRR)
 Common Services Laboratory
 Manila Testing and Quality Assurance Laboratory
 Cebu Testing and Quality Assurance Laboratory
 Davao Testing and Quality Assurance Laboratory
 Physics Laboratory Support Division
 Policy and Planning Service (PPS)
 Legal Services Support Center (LSSC)
 Investigation Division
 Litigation and Enforcement Division
 Documentation, Opinion, and Contract Review Section
 Internal Affairs Section
 Food and Drug Action Center (FDAC)
 Office of the Deputy Director General for Internal Management
 Administrative and Finance Service
 Budget and Management Division
 Accounting Division
 General Services Division
 Human Resource Development Division
 Information and Communication Technology Management Division
 Office of the Deputy Director General for Field Regulatory Operations Office
 Office of North Luzon Cluster
 Office of South Luzon Cluster
 Office of Visayas Cluster
 Office of West Mindanao Cluster
 Office of East Mindanao Cluster
 Regulatory Enforcement Unit (REU)

History

Department of Health (DOH) Secretary Francisco Duque Sr. created a subcommittee on Food and Drugs in 1961–62 to initiate an administration bill to Congress to enact a law that would ensure the safety, purity and quality of foods, drugs and cosmetics being made available to the public. The Subcommittee on Food and Drug was chaired by the then Undersecretary for Special Health Services, Dr. Rodolfo Caños, with members Dr. Trinidad Pesigan, Director of the Bureau of Research and Laboratories, Mr. Emilio Espinosa of the Bureau of Health Services, Ms. Amor Cita M. Pallera, Pharmacy Adviser, Office of the Secretary of Health, also as Secretary and Liaison to Congress. Thus, on June 22, 1963, Republic Act No. 3720 was passed into law known as the “Food, Drug and Cosmetic Act”.

To carry out the provisions of R.A. 3720, the Food and Drug Administration (FDA) was created with offices and laboratories constructed  in the DOH San Lazaro Compound, Sta. Cruz, Manila at a cost of about Php 2.5M. The Food and Drug Administration became operational with the appointment of its first FDA Administrator, Ms. Luzonica M. Pesigan on May 25, 1966, to December 7, 1977, with Mr. Emilio Espinosa as deputy director. By Virtue of R.A. 3720, the powers, functions and duties of the Division of Food and Drug Testing of the Bureau of Research and Laboratories and the Board of Food Inspection, all personnel together with all their equipment, supplies, records, files and balance of appropriations were transferred to the FDA.

With the Integrated Reorganization Plan of 1973, the Narcotic Drugs Division, Bureau of Internal Revenue, Department of Finance was Transferred to the Food and Drug Administration headed by Ms. Conception M. Fernandez who retired in 1975 with Ms. Rita V. Caoile as the next  chief of the same. Mrs. Catalina C. Sanchez took over as the next chief of the Narcotic Drugs Division in 1976.

On December 2, 1982, Executive Order No. 851 by Section 4, under the Minister of Health Hon. Jesus M. Azurin, The FDA was abolished and created the Bureau of Food and Drugs (BFAD). Mrs. Catalina C. Sanchez was appointed the first Director of the BFAD on February 20, 1984, and took her oath on February 28, 1984.

In 1987, the Bureau moved to its new site in Alabang, Muntinlupa, and acquired new facilities including state-of-the-art analytical instruments and a modern experimental animal laboratory with the $12M grant from the Government of Japan through the Japan International Cooperation Agency (JICA). This new BFAD in Alabang became operational on April 30, 1987.

In 1987, R.A. 3720 was amended by Executive Order 175 to the new title “Foods, Drugs, and Devices and Cosmetics Act”.

It was also on the same occasion of the inauguration of this new BFAD facility that Pres. Corazon C. Aquino declared publicly the Philippine National Drug Policy  (PNDP) together with its four pillars, i.e., Quality Assurance, Rational Use of Drugs, Self-Reliance, and Tailored Procurement. Based on the issuance of E.O. Nos. 174 and 175 amendments to R.A. 5921 “The Pharmacy Law” and R.A. 3720 “Food, Drug, and Cosmetic Act” respectively, the Philippine National Drug Policy was organized. Executive Order No. 851 was superseded by E.O. No. 119 s. 1987 under Hon. Alfredo R. A. Bengzon, Sec. of Health, that again reorganized the BFAD on the basis of Administrative Order (A.O.) No. 30 s. 1987, Provisions to Implement the Reorganization of the Department of Health.

Executive Order No. 102 dated May 24, 1999, was signed and redirected the functions and operations of the Department of Health, with then Hon. Alberto G. Romualdez, Sec. of Health, wherein BFAD was expanded with an added Division, the Policy, Planning, and Advocacy Division. The joining of the National Drug Policy workforce with that of BFAD in Alabang, further strengthened the Bureau to meet new challenges in serving the interests of the Filipino people consistent with the Philippine National Drug Policy and the National Health Policy.

Republic Act No. 9711, an act strengthening and rationalizing the regulatory capacity of the Bureau of Food and Drugs by establishing adequate testing laboratories and field offices, upgrading its equipment, augmenting its human resources complement, giving authority to retain its income, renaming it the Food and Drug Administration (FDA), amending certain sections of Republic Act No. 3720, was signed by President on August 18, 2009.

References

External links
 

Food and Drug Administration
1963 establishments in the Philippines
Regulators of biotechnology products